The Archdeacon of Croydon is a senior ecclesiastical officer within the Diocese of Southwark. As such the deacon is responsible for the disciplinary supervision of the clergy  within its five rural deaneries: Croydon Addington, Croydon Central, Croydon North, Croydon South and Sutton.

History
The archdeaconry was created in the Diocese of Canterbury from the Archdeaconry of Maidstone by Order in Council on 1 April 1930 and transferred to the Diocese of Southwark on 1 January 1985.

List of archdeacons
19301937 (res.): Edward Woods, Bishop suffragan of Croydon
19301942 (res.): William Anderson, Bishop suffragan of Croydon
19421946 (res.): Harold Bradfield
19461947 (res.): Maurice Harland (also Bishop suffragan of Croydon since 1942)
194827 March 1957 (d.): Charles Tonks
19571967 (res.): Jesse Clayson
19671977 (ret.): John Hughes (also Bishop suffragan of Croydon since 1956)
19781993 (res.): Frederick Hazell
The archdeaconry was transferred to Southwark diocese on 1 January 1985.
199417 September 2011 (ret.): Tony Davies (afterwards archdeacon emeritus)
20111 February 2013 (ret.): Barry Goodwin (Acting)
14 April 201329 February 2020 (ret.): Chris Skilton
15 March 202024 June 2022: Rosemarie Mallett (became Bishop of Croydon)
4 Deecember 2023present: Greg Prior

References

 
1930 establishments in England